This is a list of city managers of San Jose, California from the establishment of the office by charter amendment in 1916.

Thomas H. Reed July 1916–October 1918
W. C. Bailey August 1918–October 1920
C. B. Goodwin October 1920–May 1944
John J. Lynch May 1944–1946 
O. W. Campbell June 1946–December 1949
Anthony P. "Dutch" Hamann March 1950–November 1969
Thomas W. Fletcher December 1969–April 1973
Ted Tedesco February 1973–August 1978
James A. Alloway February 1979–May 1980
Francis T. Fox June 1980–July 1983
Gerald E. Newfarmer July 1983–May 1989
Leslie R. White May 1989–August 1994
Regina V. K. Williams November 1994–January 1999
Del D. Borgsdorf September 1999–February 2006
Leslie R. White February 2006–June 2007
Debra Figone July 2007–December 2013
Ed Shikada December 2013–January 2014
Norberto Duenas January 2014–October 2017
David Sykes October 2017–July 2021
Jennifer Maguire July 2021–present

See also
List of mayors of San Jose, California

References

Arbuckle, Clyde; Clyde Arbuckle's History of San Jose; 1985

Gallery of San Jose City Manager portraits, San Jose City Hall, 17th Floor

External links 
City of San Jose
History San Jose

City managers
City Managers
San Jose
City managers San Jose
City managers
History of San Jose, California
.City managers